71st (City of London) Yeomanry Signal Regiment is an Army Reserve regiment in the Royal Corps of Signals in the British Army. The regiment forms part of 11th Signal Brigade, providing military communications for national operations.

History
The regiment was formed as 71st (Yeomanry) Signal Regiment, Royal Signals in 1969. The squadrons at that time included HQ (London and Kent) Squadron and 68 (Inns of Court & City Yeomanry) Signal Squadron. HQ Squadron converted to a communications role and was re-designated 265 (Kent and County of London Yeomanry) Squadron in 1970.

In 2006, 47 (Middlesex Yeomanry) Signal Squadron transferred from 39th Signal Regiment (The Skinners).

In 2014, under Army 2020, 36th (Eastern) Signal Regiment reformed as 36 (Essex Yeomanry) Signal Squadron and transferred from 37th Signal Regiment. Also in 2014, under Army 2020, 47 (Middlesex Yeomanry) Signal Squadron (already part of the regiment) amalgamated with 41 (Princess Louise's Kensington) Signal Squadron (previously part of 38th (City of Sheffield) Signal Regiment) to form a new entity, 31 (Middlesex Yeomanry and Princess Louise's Kensington) Signal Squadron.

Current structure
The regiment's current structure is as follows:

 Regimental Headquarters, in Bexleyheath
 31 (Middlesex Yeomanry and Princess Louise's Kensington) Signal Squadron, in Uxbridge
 841 (Princess Louise's Kensington) Signal Troop, in Coulsdon
 36 (Eastern) Signal Squadron, in Colchester
 854 (East Anglian) Signal Troop, in Chelmsford
 68 (Inns of Court & City Yeomanry) Signal Squadron, in Whipps Cross
 847 (London) Signal Troop, in White City, London
 265 (Kent and County of London Yeomanry (Sharpshooters)) Support Squadron, in Bexleyheath

See also

 Units of the Royal Corps of Signals

References

Regiments of the Royal Corps of Signals
Yeomanry regiments of the British Army